Tofa may refer to:

Tofa language, a Turkic language spoken in Russia's Irkutsk Oblast
Bashir Tofa, a Nigerian politician.
TOFA, Tall oil fatty acids
Tofa, Nigeria, a Local Government Area of Kano State
Tofa (Poetic Edda), the wife of Angantyr and mother of Hervor in the Poetic Edda
Tofa Fakunle, Canadian soccer player